The Watermelon is an independent feature film penned by Michael Hemmingson and directed by Brad Mays. It is produced by Lorenda Starfelt at LightSong Films in North Hollywood.The Watermelon is Michael Hemmingson's first produced full-length screenplay, and director Brad Mays' fourth feature film.

Description
The Watermelon has been called "a story without seeds" and "a film about how really weird stuff can happen."  It is a metaphysical comedy about a fellow who receives a mysterious inheritance from his long lost alcoholic stepfather: a ratty old trailer painted like a watermelon.  This draws in a number of odd characters who bug him, including a romantic interest, a woman on the run from her psycho drug-addict criminal husband. The quirky love story stars Will Beinbrink and Kiersten Morgan. Mike Ivy, who plays Homer, is a regular on The Sarah Silverman Program. Bob Golub, who plays Creon, has been seen in Goodfellas and Art School Confidential.

Background
Beach scenes were shot in Malibu, on the property of Tony Romano, executive producer of Catch Me If You Can and I, Robot. "Hemmingson is one of the best screenwriters out there," Romano has stated, "only no one in this goddamn town knows it." An intimate beach scene was fashioned by director Mays into an homage to the famous "bullocks scene" from Ken Russell's 1969 film Women In Love, with Kiersten Morgan dancing and singing I'm Forever Blowing Bubbles, parodying actress Glenda Jackson's dancing to the same tune sung by co-star Jennie Linden.

Other scenes were shot in Pasadena, Beverly Hills, and North Hollywood, although the film is supposed to take place in an unnamed beach community in southern California, a cross between Encinitas and Ocean Beach in San Diego.

Director Brad Mays gave as much time to rehearsing the actors as the production budget would bear, and encouraged the actors towards inventiveness in exploring their roles. The actors were also directed to memorize their lines "down to the semi-colon". The film itself was shot in the summer of 2007, over a roughly three-week period. By most accounts, the set was very pleasant for both cast and crew. Post production on The Watermelon took the better part of a year. A great deal of attention was given to the soundtrack. The original live vocal performances were very carefully worked, in order to avoid overdubbing, which would have destroyed the immediacy of the actors' performances. Peter Girard was engaged to write the original score at a point about six months into post production, and the final musical cue was laid in roughly ten days before the San Diego Film Festival, where the film premiered.

Release, distribution, award
The Watermelon received its World Premiere at the 2008 San Diego Film Festival. It was subsequently acquired by Celebrity Video Distribution and released to the public on July 7, 2009. In January 2011 The Watermelon was the recipient of the California Film Awards' prestigious "Diamond Award" for feature film.

References

External links 
 
 
 Bill's Movie Reviews .
 Turner Classic Movies catalog listing.

2008 films
American independent films
Films directed by Brad Mays
2000s English-language films
2000s American films